POV most commonly refers to:
 Point of view (disambiguation)

POV or PoV may also refer to:

Science and technology
 Persistence of vision, the optical illusion whereby multiple discrete images blend into a single image in the human mind
 Pyramid of vision, a 3D computer graphics term describing what the viewer sees
 Percentage of volume or participate, an algorithm buying or selling at a defined percentage of the exchange volume

Media and entertainment
 P.O.V. (magazine), a lifestyle magazine targeted at young professional men
 POV (TV series), a PBS television program showing independent, non-fiction film
 POV (album), an album by Utopia (1985)
 "POV" (song), a song by Ariana Grande (2020)
 "P.O.V.", a track on the album Radio:Active by McFly (2008)
 "POV" (Batman: The Animated Series), an episode in Batman fiction
 PoV, a live concert video album by Peter Gabriel
 People on Vacation, an American rock band starring Jaret Reddick of Bowling for Soup and Ryan Hamilton of Smile Smile
 POV pornography, a subset of gonzo pornography in which the performer also holds the camera
 "P.O.V.", the seventh track on the album Morning After by dvsn (2017)

Other
 Power of Veto (disambiguation)
 Parliament of Victoria, Australia
 Privately owned vehicle, as a US government acronym
 POV, Bible translations into Persian
 POV (ᐱᐅᕖ), Inuit surname

See also
 POV hat, a control on some video game joysticks
 POV shot, a technique in motion photography
 POV-Ray, the Persistence of Vision Raytracer, a ray tracing computer graphics program